Oligostilbenoids  (oligo- or polystilbenes) are oligomeric forms of stilbenoids. Some molecules are large enough to be considered polyphenols and constitute a class of tannins.

Examples

Dimers 
 Ampelopsin A
 Epsilon-viniferin
 Pallidol
 Quadrangularin A

Trimers 
 α-Viniferin
 Ampelopsin E
 trans-Diptoindonesin B
 Gnetin H

Tetramers 
 cajyphenol A
 cajyphenol B
 Flexuosol A
 Hemsleyanol D
 Hopeaphenol
 Vaticanol B
 R2-Viniferin (syn. Vitisin A)

Modified 
 Diptoindonesin C can be isolated from the bark of Shorea pinanga

Other 
 Diptoindonesin F can be isolated from the bark of Shorea gibbosa

Glycosides 
 Diptoindonesin A

References

External links